David Laird was a Canadian politician.

David Laird may also refer to:

David Allen Laird, soil scientist
Davie Laird, Scottish footballer
David Carter Laird
David Laird, co-founder of Kitson & Co.